The grey-cheeked green pigeon (Treron griseicauda) is a species of bird in the family Columbidae.  It is endemic to Indonesia.

References

Treron
Birds of Indonesia
Birds described in 1863
Taxonomy articles created by Polbot